Shāh Chérāgh or Shahcheragh Shrine is the tomb of Ahmed bin Musa (Imam Reza's brother) in the center of Shiraz. It is the third most important shrine in Shia Islam in Iran, after the Imam Reza shrine and Fatima Masumeh Shrine. Ahmed bin Musa traveled to Khorasan on the way to join his brother, but he was killed by Al-Ma'mun Abbasid Caliphate in Shiraz. Shāh-é-Chérāgh is a Persian term for "King of the Light". The site is the most important place of pilgrimage within the city of Shiraz.

Overview

The tombs became celebrated pilgrimage centres in the 14th century when Queen Tashi Khatun erected a mosque and theological school in the vicinity. The site was given this name due to the nature of the discovery of the site by Ayatullah Dastghā'ib (the great grandfather of the contemporary Ayatullah Dastghā'ib). He used to see light from a distance and decided to investigate the source. He found that the light was being emitted by a grave within a graveyard. The grave that emitted the light was excavated, and a body wearing an armor was discovered. The body was wearing a ring saying al-'Izzatu Lillāh, Ahmad bin Mūsā, meaning "The Pride belongs to God, Ahmad son of Musa". Thus it became known that this was the burial site of the sons of Mūsā al-Kādhim.

History

The site is the most important place of pilgrimage within the city of Shiraz. Ahmad came to Shiraz at the beginning of the third Islamic century (approximately 900 AD), and died there. During the rule of Abu Bakr ibn Sa'd of the Salghurid dynasty, the chief minister to the monarch by the name of Amir Muqarrab al-Din Mas'ud built the tomb chamber, the dome, as well as a colonnaded porch. The mosque remained this way for roughly 100 years before further work was initiated by Queen Tash Khātūn (the mother of Shāh Abū Ishāq Injū) during the years 1344–1349 (745–750 AH). She carried out essential repairs, constructed an edifice, a hall of audience, a fine college, and a tomb for herself on the south side. She also presented a unique Qur'an of thirty volumes, written in golden thuluth characters with gold decoration, in the style of the calligraphist of that period, Yahya Jamali. The date written on the Qur'an indicates that they were written from 1344–1345 (754–746 AH). Nothing now remains of the buildings set up by Queen Tash Khātūn, but the Qur'ans have remained and are preserved in the Pars Museum.

The mosque again underwent necessary repairs in 1506 (912 AH – under the reign of Shāh Ismā'īl I), which were initiated by the guardian of the mosque at the time, Mirza Habibullah Sharifi. The mosque was again repaired in 1588 (997 AH) when half of the structure collapsed as a result of an earthquake. During the nineteenth century, the mosque was damaged several times and was subsequently repaired. In 1827 (1243 AH), Fat'h 'Alī Shāh Qājār presented an ornamental railing for the tomb. Another earthquake shook the mosque in 1852 (1269 AH), and repairs were carried out by Muhammad Nasir Zahir ad-Dawla.

Finally, the late Nasirol'molk repaired the dome, but on account of the numerous cracks, in 1958 the whole dome was removed, and in its place an iron structure, which was lighter, and likely to last longer, in the shape of the original dome, was made at the cost of the people of Shiraz. The present building consists of the original portico, with its ten columns, on the eastern side, a spacious sanctuary with lofty alcoves on four sides, a mosque on the western side of the sanctuary, and various rooms. There are also numerous tombs contiguous to the Mausoleum.

The decorative work in a mosaic of mirror glass, the inscriptions in stucco, the ornamentation, the doors covered with panels of silver, the portico, and the wide courtyard are most attractive. The tomb, with its latticed railing, is in an alcove between the space beneath the dome and the mosque. And this custom of placing the tomb in this position, so that it is not directly under the dome, is to be seen in other famous places of pilgrimage in the city of Shiraz, and may be considered a special feature of Shiraz shrines. Two short minarets, situated at each end of the columned portico, add impressiveness to the Mausoleum, and to the spacious courtyard, which surrounds it on three sides. The Shah-e-Cheragh Mausoleum was registered on 10 February 1940, under No. 363 in the list of the national monuments of Iran.

Rated by many travellers as the most beautiful mosque in the world, the shrine was popularised in the West when in October 1976, Interview magazine published a Firooz Zahedi photo shoot of Elizabeth Taylor as a cover story.

2022 shooting

On 26 October 2022, at least 15 people were killed in a mass shooting at Shah Cheragh mausoleum. The three attackers are described by Iranian state media as apparently being takfiri terrorists. Two attackers have been arrested; the other is at large. Later the same day, Islamic State claimed responsibility for the attack. The Iranian authorities said that the attackers are not Iranian nationals. Iranian semi-official Tasnim news agency stated that children are among the dead. The United Nations have condemned the attack on the religious site.

Sayyid Alā al-Dīn Husayn
Another important pilgrimage centre in the historical city of Shiraz is the mausoleum of Sayyid Husayn, another son of Mūsā al-Kādhim. This mausoleum is located near the south-east corner of Shiraz. The mausoleum itself is a tall building bearing a lofty dome. The original entrance was on the south side, approached by a small courtyard from the road that runs beside it. On the western side there is an area, more or less spacious, which was formerly a cemetery, but is now regarded as the western courtyard of the mausoleum.

The mausoleum's interior consists of a tall sanctuary ornamented with designs in facets of mirror beneath the dome, and the tomb, as in the other places of pilgrimage in Shiraz, is situated in an alcove on the northern side, and there is a mosque adjacent to the sanctuary behind the railing of the tomb. The original building of the mausoleum was constructed by Qotlogh Khan, who in the Ilkhanate and Timurid period, at the close of the fourteenth, or at the beginning of the fifteenth century, was Governor of Shiraz, and had a garden where the present mausoleum stands, which was built over the site where the grave appeared to be.

There is an inscription in Sols (Thuluth) script above the sanctuary, dated 943 A.H. (1563 AD), the writer of which was called Seyavash. The present Shrine was built in 923 A.H. (1517 AD).

The Soltan Khalil mentioned is Soltan Zu'l-qadr who during the reign of the Safavid Shah Isma'il I was for fifteen years, from 911 to 926 A.H. (1505–1519 AD), Governor of Fars, and who according to what is written in the Naseri Fars-Nameh, on account of misconduct at the battle of Chalderan, was by order of Shah Ismail put to death in 926 A.H.

The year 943 A.H., mentioned at the end of the inscription above the sanctuary (below the dome), indicates that in the time of Shah Tahmasb I the work of completing the mausoleum was accomplished. On account of the instability of the soil, and the earthquakes that occurred in Shiraz, this building suffered considerable damage, and a part of the dome, which had last been repaired by the late Mirza Abu'l-Hasan Moshiro'l-molk, gave way, and was threatened with collapse, and in spite of repairs, and much reinforcement, which was carried out by the late General Riazi, the former Director of Education in Fars, and subsequently, the threat of dissolution increased daily, until in the year 1950 the dome was taken down by the Fars Department of Education. Then a dome of less weight, with an interior iron structure, was prepared, at the cost of the funds of the mausoleum, and it was placed in position in 1952, and during several succeeding years a covering of brick and enamelled tiling was applied in the shape of the original dome.

The Mausoleum of Sayyid Husayn was registered on 20 December 1937, under No, 307 in the list of the historical monuments of Iran

Gallery

See also

Holiest sites in Shia Islam
Imām Ridhā Mosque
Fatimah al-Ma'sūmah Mosque
Shāh Abdol Azīm Mosque
History of Persian domes
Alwar State

References

External links
Photos
The Mausoleum of Shah-e-Cheragh
Video of the inside

Mosques in Shiraz
Buildings and structures in Shiraz
Shia shrines
Safavid architecture